The Elphinstone Hotel is an Australian pub located in , Victoria, originally named the Commercial Hotel and known over the years as Lonsdale’s Hotel, Doran’s Hotel and Tagell’s Hotel.

History
In the 1840s Elphinstone was known as Sawpit Gully and was renamed in the early 1800s. Built  and first commercially licensed by Sarah Fyans in 1871. In 1875 Sarah Fyans married Friedrick Richard Lonsdale and the licence transferred to him until his death in 1889.

Sarah Lonsdale owned the hotel until approximately 1905 when it was purchased by Newman & Co.  Members of Sarah’s family ran the hotel until 1921, (50 years) except for 4 ½ years when it was leased to Joseph Archer.
In 1922 a public telephone and exchange were located there as well as a store, which operated from the present day lounge until the 1960s, when it was moved to the newly built Elphinstone Post Office.

Before refrigeration, the hotel cellar was used to store the bodies of deceased locals before burial.  Inquests were also held at the hotel.

From the 1920s to the 1950s publicans struggled to make a living from the hotel and by 1955 the hotel was literally falling down. When the Victorian Licensing Board threatened to revoke the licence a group of local graziers (Jim Barty, Alf Fletcher, Alan Finning, Ringan Oliver, Ian MacRae and Louis Smith), fearing the town would 
die if the hotel closed, pooled 500 pounds each to purchase the freehold and renovate the hotel.

Description
The Elphinstone Hotel is a large building (approx. 480 sq. metres) and has the appearance of a mid 1900s hotel even though it was built in the 1860s. 
Major renovations in 1956 have changed the building’s form to a corrugated iron, wide hipped roof adorned by two 1950s style chimneys. 
A straight, pitched veranda, (3 x 23 metres) at the front is slung from below the roofline.  The veranda has no decoration and is supported by plain timber posts on concrete stumps.
The original old brick walls are now clad in stippled concrete and painted cream.
The timber sash windows and French style double glass doors to the bar and rear entrance, were obviously replaced during the 1950s renovations .
Although much has changed, the hotel has many original features including the underground blue stone cellar which may even pre-date the building of the original brick hotel.
The hotel sits on a large triangular allotment (approx. 75 x 40 x 86 metres), which is surrounded by a dark green Colorbond fence. Many old hand made bricks were uncovered during the construction of the fence, possibly the chimney remains of the Freemason’s Tavern which burnt down in 1879. 
An old iron and red gum shedding  which sat on the southern fence line of the property was rebuilt in 2016 to the same original design and style.
The small paddock on the south eastern corner of the property is used by the hotel as a customer Horse Paddock for those who ride horses to the hotel.
Situated next to the Swan Hill railway line, the hotel along with the historic Elphinstone Railway Station, Bateman’s Garage and the war memorial form an historic triangle of the township.

Licensees

*   (LIC. = Licensee)
|-
|17 august 2022
| Guryad Singh Chahal (LIC.)

References

Hotels in Victoria (Australia)
Pubs in Victoria (Australia)
Commercial buildings completed in 1860
1860 establishments in Australia